Tomopterus brevicornis  is a species of beetle in the family Cerambycidae. It was described by Giesbert in 1996.

References

Tomopterus
Beetles described in 1996